
Bomilcar was a Carthaginian commander in the war against Agathocles, who invaded Africa in 310BC.

In the first battle with the invaders, his colleague Hanno was killed and, according to Diodorus, Bomilcar permitted the enemy to succeed on the field with the hope that his frightened countrymen would permit him to become tyrant of Carthage. In 308BC, after many delays and misgivings, he attempted to seize the government with the aid of 500 citizens and a number of mercenaries but his followers were induced to desert him by promises of pardon. He himself was taken and crucified.

See also
 Other Bomilcars in Carthaginian history
 Melqart, the Canaanite deity

References

Citations

Bibliography
 . 
 

Carthaginians
Carthaginian generals
4th-century BC Punic people
People executed by crucifixion